The 1993–94 season was Cardiff City F.C.'s 67th season in the Football League. They competed in the 24-team Division Two, then the third tier of English football, finishing nineteenth.

Players

First team squad.

Standings

Results by round

Fixtures and results

Second Division

Source

League Cup

FA Cup

UEFA Cup Winners Cup

Welsh Cup

Autoglass Trophy

See also
List of Cardiff City F.C. seasons

References

Bibliography

Welsh Football Data Archive

1993-94
Welsh football clubs 1993–94 season
1993–94 Football League Second Division by team